Marisa is a town and administrative district in Gorontalo, Indonesia, and the regency seat of Pohuwato Regency. The district of Marisa had an estimated population of 21,043 in 2016.

Climate
Marisa has a tropical rainforest climate (Af) with heavy rainfall year-round.

References

Populated places in Gorontalo (province)
Regency seats of Gorontalo